Cumbre de la Majadita is a mountain peak in the province of San Juan in Argentina near the town of Rodeo. It was one of the last 6000m+ peaks in the Andes to be climbed, the first recorded ascent being in December 1996. 

The peak has some large but easy angled glaciers on its flanks.

See also
 List of mountains in Argentina
 List of Ultras of South America
 List of mountains in the Andes

References

External links
 "Majadita, Argentina" on Peakbagger

Mountains of Argentina
Volcanoes of Argentina